Reading Magic: How Your Child Can Learn to Read Before School - and Other Read-aloud Miracles is a 2001 book by Mem Fox. In it, Fox propounds reading books aloud to children from when they are babies to after they can read by themselves.

Reception
In a review of Reading Magic Booklist noted its "cheerful, chatty style that's totally jargon-free" and recommended it for new parents. January Magazine''', in its review, wrote: "Fox' book isn't some boring, didactic treatise on how to improve your child's reading skills. In fact, she's not at all fond of the phonics fanatics, and even discourages making your child read aloud to show their progress". Library Journal Review calls it a "rah-rah book on the benefits of reading aloud to children" and "a marginal purchase for public libraries".Reading Magic has also been reviewed by Publishers Weekly and the School Library Journal''.

References

External links

 Library holdings of Reading Magic

2001 non-fiction books
Australian non-fiction books
Parenting advice books
Books by Mem Fox